Dolichancistrus is a genus of suckermouth armored catfishes native to South America.

Species
There are currently six recognized species in this genus:
 Dolichancistrus atratoensis (Dahl, 1960)
 Dolichancistrus carnegiei (C. H. Eigenmann, 1916)
 Dolichancistrus cobrensis (L. P. Schultz, 1944)
 Dolichancistrus fuesslii (Steindachner, 1911)
 Dolichancistrus pediculatus (C. H. Eigenmann, 1918)
 Dolichancistrus setosus (Boulenger, 1887)

References

Loricariidae
Fish of South America
Catfish genera
Taxa named by Isaäc J. H. Isbrücker
Freshwater fish genera